The Pepperdine Waves baseball team represents Pepperdine University in the sport of baseball. The Pepperdine Waves compete in Division I of the National Collegiate Athletics Association (NCAA) and in the West Coast Conference. They are currently led by head coach Rick Hirtensteiner.

The Waves have been to the College World Series twice, winning the national championship in 1992 under head coach Andy Lopez with a win over Cal State Fullerton.

Head coaches 

Source

Year-by-year results 

Source

Pepperdine in the NCAA tournament
The NCAA Division I baseball tournament started in 1947.
The format of the tournament has changed through the years.

Source

Individual awards

A number of Pepperdine players have earned individual honors, including All-American honors, All-College World Series honors, and West Coast Conference honors.

All-Americans

1979
Mike Gates, 2B

1982
Jon Furman, P

1985
Brad Bierley, OF
Scott Marrett, P

1987
Paul Faries, SS

1989
Rick Hirtensteiner, OF

1990
Steve Duda, P (Freshman)
Steve Rodriguez, 2B (Freshman)

1991
Pat Ahearne, P
Steve Montgomery, P
Steve Rodriguez, 2B

1992
Pat Ahearne, P
Dan Melendez, 1B
Steve Montgomery, P
Steve Rodriguez, 2B

1993
Steve Duda, P

1995
Ryan Christenson, OF

1997
Randy Wolf, P
Steve Schenewerk, P (Freshman)

1999
Jay Adams, P
Jay Gehrke, P
Dane Sardinha, C
Dan Haren, P (Freshman)

2000
Dane Sardinha, C

2001
Dan Haren, P
Noah Lowry, P
Jared Pitney, 1B

2003
David Uribes, SS (Freshman)

2004
Chad Tracy, C (Freshman)

2005
Steve Kleen, P
Chad Tracy, C
Barry Enright, P (Freshman)

2006
Chase d'Arnaud, P (Freshman)
Brett Hunter, P (Freshman)

2007
Barry Enright, P

2008
Eric Thames, OF

2009
Cole Cook, P (Freshman)

2016
A. J. Puckett, P

All College World Series

1979
Mike Gates, 2B

1992
Pat Ahearne, P
Dan Melendez, 1B
Steve Rodriguez, 2B
Scott Vollmer, C

Brooks Wallace Award
2012
Zach Vincej, SS

Conference awards

West Coast Conference Player of the Year
Mark Lee - 1976
Brad Bierley - 1985
Steve Erickson & Paul Faries - 1987
Rick Hirtensteiner - 1989
Steve Rodriguez - 1992
Ryan Christenson - 1995
Dane Sardinha - 2000
Dan Haren - 2001
Kevin Estrada - 2003
Chad Tracy - 2005
Eric Thames - 2008
Joe Sever - 2012

West Coast Conference Pitcher of the Year
Scott Marrett - 1985
Mike Fetters - 1986
Doug Simons - 1988
Britt Craven - 1989 & 1990
Pat Ahearne - 1992
Steve Duda - 1993
Randy Wolf - 1997
Jay Adams - 1999
Noah Lowry - 2001
Greg Ramirez - 2003
Paul Coleman - 2005
Barry Enright - 2006
A. J. Puckett - 2016

Waves in Major League Baseball
34 former Pepperdine players have played Major League Baseball.

Pat Ahearne
Bill Bathe
Ryan Christenson
Chase d'Arnaud
Barry Enright
Paul Faries
Mike Fetters
Danny Garcia
Mike Gates
Dan Haren
Gail Hopkins
Matt Howard

Chad Kreuter
Jalal Leach
Mark Lee
Noah Lowry
David Matranga
Steve Montgomery
Jon Moscot
David Newhan
Will Ohman
Rob Picciolo
Ryan Radmanovich
Steve Rodriguez

Dane Sardinha
Mike Scott
Doug Simons
Andy Stankiewicz
Eric Thames
Jason Thompson
Chad Tracy
Derek Wallace
Matt Wise
Randy Wolf
Danny Worth

See also

List of NCAA Division I baseball programs

References

External links